Ironbark is a common name of a number of species in three taxonomic groups within the genus Eucalyptus

Ironbark may also refer to:

Places
Ironbark, Queensland
Ironbark, Victoria
Stuart Town, New South Wales, formerly called Ironbark

Other
Ironbark, an album by The Waifs
Ironbark Zinc, an Australian mining company
Ironbark, the festival title of the 2020 American-British film The Courier
The Man from Ironbark, a poem by Banjo Paterson